John Weller may refer to:

 John B. Weller (1812–1875), governor of California, congressman from Ohio, U.S. senator from California, and minister to Mexico
 John Weller (bishop) (1880–1969), Anglican priest
 John Sheridan Weller, attorney and politician
 Jac Weller (John Weller, 1913–1994), American college football player, firearms expert and military historian
 Paul Weller (John William Weller, Jr., born 1958), English singer, songwriter, and musician